Fusheh (also Romanized as Fūsheh) is a village in Gurab Pas Rural District, in the Central District of Fuman County, Gilan Province, Iran. At the 2006 census, its population was 755, in 212 families.

References 

Populated places in Fuman County